Thai Airways International Flight 620 was a scheduled Thai Airways International  passenger flight from Bangkok to Osaka via Manila. The Airbus A300B4-601 aircraft, originating in Bangkok, suffered an explosion mid-flight. The aircraft was later repaired and there were no fatalities. The cause was a hand grenade brought onto the plane by a Japanese gangster of the Yamaguchi-gumi. 62 of the 239 people on board were injured. The aircraft descended rapidly and was able to land safely at Osaka.

Aircraft involved and Aftermath 
The aircraft involved, HS-TAE, was repaired and returned to service, continuing to fly for Thai Airways International. In 2008, the aircraft was transferred to Unical Aviation and registered as N395EF. The aircraft has since been scrapped.

References

Accidents and incidents involving the Airbus A300
Aviation accidents and incidents in 1986
620
October 1986 events in Asia
Yamaguchi-gumi
Crime in Japan
Aviation accidents and incidents in Japan